Elio Lampridio Cervino or Cerva (1463–1520) was a Ragusan poet who wrote in Latin.

Life
Cerva was born in 1463, belonging to one of the most important noble families of Ragusa, the House of Cerva.

He spent several years in Rome, where he arrived still child, to succeed his uncle Stephan, ambassador to Pope Sixtus IV. Here, in the circle of Pomponio Leto, his poetic talent awoke. He studied ancient drama and made a study of the comedies of Plautus. It was in this period that he produced Lexicon (1480), an encyclopedic dictionary in Latin, 429 pages long and in quarto format (33 x 23 cm). He returned to Ragusa in 1490, and became a spokesman for the Republic. Finally, Cerva decided to withdraw to the Ombla river island, where he remained until his death in 1520. Although called a poet, he published only four short components (all in Latin) during his life. His main work, De Epidauro, was a draft of an epic poem, about the Ottoman invasions of Ragusan territory.

A staunch supporter of Latin, he disliked Slavic, which was spoken in the Republic in great numbers. He declared his nostalgia for the times when no language other than Latin had been officially used in Ragusa, and wished not to hear the "infecting Slavic language". He knew and wrote solely in Latin, as mentioned by him in one of his works:

See also
 List of Ragusans

References 

People from the Republic of Ragusa
1463 births
1520 deaths
15th-century Latin writers
People from Dubrovnik
Ragusan poets
15th-century Croatian poets